Southend-on-Sea City Council is the local authority for the unitary authority of Southend-on-Sea in Essex, England. Until 1 April 1998 it was a non-metropolitan district.

Political control
Since the first election to the council in 1973 political control of the council has been held by the following parties:

Non-metropolitan district

Unitary authority

Leadership
The leaders of the council since 2003 have been:

Council elections

Non-metropolitan district elections
1973 Southend-on-Sea Borough Council election
1976 Southend-on-Sea Borough Council election (New ward boundaries)
1979 Southend-on-Sea Borough Council election
1980 Southend-on-Sea Borough Council election
1982 Southend-on-Sea Borough Council election
1983 Southend-on-Sea Borough Council election
1984 Southend-on-Sea Borough Council election
1986 Southend-on-Sea Borough Council election
1987 Southend-on-Sea Borough Council election
1988 Southend-on-Sea Borough Council election
1990 Southend-on-Sea Borough Council election
1991 Southend-on-Sea Borough Council election
1992 Southend-on-Sea Borough Council election
1994 Southend-on-Sea Borough Council election
1995 Southend-on-Sea Borough Council election
1996 Southend-on-Sea Borough Council election

Unitary authority elections
1997 Southend-on-Sea Borough Council election
1999 Southend-on-Sea Borough Council election
2000 Southend-on-Sea Borough Council election
2001 Southend-on-Sea Borough Council election (New ward boundaries increased the number of seats by 12)
2002 Southend-on-Sea Borough Council election
2003 Southend-on-Sea Borough Council election
2004 Southend-on-Sea Borough Council election
2006 Southend-on-Sea Borough Council election
2007 Southend-on-Sea Borough Council election
2008 Southend-on-Sea Borough Council election
2010 Southend-on-Sea Borough Council election
2011 Southend-on-Sea Borough Council election
2012 Southend-on-Sea Borough Council election
2014 Southend-on-Sea Borough Council election
2015 Southend-on-Sea Borough Council election
2016 Southend-on-Sea Borough Council election
2018 Southend-on-Sea Borough Council election
2019 Southend-on-Sea Borough Council election
2021 Southend-on-Sea Borough Council election
2022 Southend-on-Sea Borough Council election

By-election results

There have been several by-elections after this date. Information to be added....

References

External links
Southend-on-Sea Borough Council
By-election results

 
Politics of Southend-on-Sea
Council elections in Essex
Unitary authority elections in England